Galchutt is an unincorporated community in Richland County, North Dakota, United States. Galchutt is located along the Red River Valley and Western Railroad , northwest of Wahpeton.

The village of Galchutt took its name from the owner Hans Galchutt. He first built a home, store and grain warehouse in the area in 1882.

Richland County was created by the Dakota Territory in 1873. Original indigenous residents were from the Santee Sioux tribe.

References

External links
 History of Galchutt, North Dakota, 1882-1982 from the Digital Horizons website

Unincorporated communities in Richland County, North Dakota
Unincorporated communities in North Dakota